Truman Smith (November 27, 1791 – May 3, 1884) was a Whig member of the United States Senate from Connecticut from 1849 to 1854 and a member of the United States House of Representatives from Connecticut's 4th and 5th congressional districts from 1839 to 1843 and from 1845 to 1849. He also served in the Connecticut House of Representatives from 1831 to 1832, and in 1834.

Biography
Smith was born in Roxbury, Connecticut. He was the nephew of Nathaniel Smith and Nathan Smith. Smith completed preparatory studies and graduated from Yale College in 1815, where he was a member of Brothers in Unity. He studied law at Litchfield Law School and was admitted to the bar in 1818, commencing practice in Litchfield, Connecticut. He married Maria Cook on June 2, 1832, and they had three children, Catherine Marie Smith, Jeannie Penniman (Jane) Smith, and George Webster Smith. His wife, Marie, died on April 20, 1849. He married Mary Ann Dickinson Walker on November 7, 1850, by whom he had six children, Truman Houston Smith, Samuel Hubbard Smith, Edmond Dickinson Smith, Robert Shufeldt Smith, Henry Humphry Smith, and Allen Hoyt Smith.

Career
Smith was a member of the Connecticut House of Representatives from 1831 to 1832 and again in 1834. He was elected a Whig to the United States House of Representatives, representing the 5th district, during the Twenty-sixth and Twenty-seventh Congresses, and serving from March 4, 1839, to March 3, 1843, declining renomination in 1842.

Smith was a presidential elector on the Whig ticket in 1844 He was elected back to the House of Representatives representing the 4th District for the Twenty-ninth and Thirtieth Congresses. He served from March 4, 1845, to March 3, 1849. Smith declined the appointment to be the first United States Secretary of the Interior from President Zachary Taylor in 1849 having been elected to the United States Senate. He served from March 4, 1849, until his resignation May 24, 1854.

Between 1846 and 1854, Truman Smith acted as a prototype to the National Party Chairman for Whig campaigns. For instance, in 1846, he travelled across the country collecting donations from business leaders. He also printed and dispersed pamphlets and speeches that made the Whig position clear, and distributed those throughout the country. In that midterm, the Whigs did particularly well, holding all of their Northern Congressional seats and picking up fourteen House Seats in New York, one in New Jersey, five in Pennsylvania, three in Ohio and one in Georgia. Admittedly, he focused on Iowa, as it was being admitted to the union and would therefore allocate two US Senators that year, but came up short and Democrats won the State Senate. That shouldn't downplay the dramatic success for Whiggery, however. While this did coincide with a legislative session which was heavy on Democrats passing economic policy that many in the country found controversial, Truman Smith's guidance no doubt further cemented Whig gains in that cycle. 

Afterwards, he lived in Stamford, Connecticut, with his second wife, Mary Ann Dickinson Smith, while practicing law in New York City, New York. Mary Ann was the adopted daughter of the miniaturist Anson Dickinson.  
Smith's New York law office was open from 1854 to 1871. In 1862, President Abraham Lincoln appointed Smith judge of the Court of Arbitration under the treaty of 1862 with Great Britain for the suppression of the slave trade where he served until 1870.

Death
Smith retired from business that year and died in Stamford, Connecticut, on May 3, 1884,(age 92 years, 158 days). He is interred at Stamford in Woodland Cemetery.

References

External links

1791 births
1884 deaths
Connecticut lawyers
Members of the Connecticut House of Representatives
New York (state) lawyers
People from Roxbury, Connecticut
Politicians from Stamford, Connecticut
United States Article I federal judges appointed by Abraham Lincoln
1844 United States presidential electors
United States senators from Connecticut
Whig Party United States senators
Yale College alumni
Litchfield Law School alumni
Whig Party members of the United States House of Representatives from Connecticut
19th-century American politicians
19th-century American judges
19th-century American lawyers